Epilabis is a genus of earwigs in the subfamily Anisolabidinae. It was cited by Steinmann in The Animal Kingdom.

References

External links
 The Earwig Research Centre's Epilabis database Source for references: type Epilabis in the "genus" field and click "search".

Anisolabididae
Dermaptera genera